The Fordham Law Review is a student-run law journal associated with the Fordham University School of Law that covers a wide range of legal scholarship.

Overview 
In 2017, the Fordham Law Review was the seventh-most cited law journal by other journals, and the fifth-most cited by courts. The journal's content consists generally of academic articles, symposia, and student-written notes.

History 
The Fordham Law Review was established in 1914 at the Fordham University School of Law. However, it suspended publication after only three years, following the United States' entry into World War I. The final issue before suspension provided a brief explanatory statement:

Owing to the war, the Review will close this year with this number. Some of the Board of Editors are in military service, with national and state organizations. Others are at the training camps for reserve officers.

The journal did not restart publication until 1935 amidst the Great Depression. Soon thereafter it garnered attention for its publication of Fordham Law School Dean Ignatius M. Wilkinson's testimony before the Senate Judiciary Committee condemning Franklin D. Roosevelt Judiciary Reorganization Bill of 1937. Wilkinson's testimony, published in the May 1937 edition of the journal, warned Congress that the President's plan "reaches down to and shakes the foundations of our constitutional structure."

In 2011, the journal launched the Fordham Law Review Online. The Fordham Law Review Online provides a forum for responses to articles published in the regular journal and to comment on contemporary legal issues. Articles published in the Fordham Law Review Online are available on the journal's website and on Digital Commons.

Membership 
The journal is managed by a board of up to 20 student editors. It selects approximately 65 staff members each year to assist with production. Membership on the Fordham Law Review is open to all first-year Fordham law students and transfer students. The journal offers positions to approximately 20 students on the basis of first-year grades and 45 students on the basis of their submissions to a writing competition and personal statements.

Notable alumni 

Alessandra Biaggi (born 1986), New York State Senator
Vincent L. Briccetti, US District Judge, Southern District of New York
Denny Chin, judge, US Court of Appeals for the Second Circuit
Robert J. Corcoran, Justice of the Arizona Supreme Court
Jeffery Deaver (born 1950), writer
Steven B. Derounian, US Congressman and New York State judge
Daniel M. Donovan, Jr., District Attorney, Staten Island, New York
Claire Eagan, US District Judge, Northern District of Oklahoma
John Feerick (born 1936), former dean of Fordham Law School
Denis Reagan Hurley, US District Judge, Eastern District of New York
G. Gordon Liddy, former FBI agent, lawyer, talk show host, actor, and figure in the Watergate scandal
Joseph M. McLaughlin, Judge, US Court of Appeals for the Second Circuit
William Hughes Mulligan, judge of the US Court of Appeals for the Second Circuit
Lawrence W. Pierce, former Judge of US Court of Appeals for the Second Circuit
Mario Procaccino (1912-1995), New York City Comptroller and mayoral candidate
Cathy Seibel, US District Judge, Southern District of New York

Notable articles 
Deborah W. Denno, The Lethal Injection Quandary: How Medicine Has Dismantled the Death Penalty, 76  49 (2007).
Harold Hongju Koh, A World Drowning in Guns, 71  2333 (2003).
Constantine N. Katsoris, The Arbitration of a Public Securities Dispute, 53  279 (1984).
Comment, DES and a Proposed Theory of Enterprise Liability, 46  963 (1978).
Warren E. Burger, Are Specialized Training and Certification of Advocates Essential to Our System of Justice?, 42  227 (1973).
John Feerick, The Proposed Twenty-Fifth Amendment to the Constitution, 34  173 (1965).
Comment, Tortious Acts as a Basis for Jurisdiction in Products Liability Cases, 33  671 (1965).
Ignatius N. Wilkinson, The President's Plan Respecting the Supreme Court, 6  179 (1937).
Michael A. Woronoff & Jonathan A. Rosen, Understanding Anti-Dilution Provisions in Convertible Securities, 74  129 (2007).

References

External links 

American law journals
Law Review
General law journals
Publications established in 1914
1914 establishments in New York City
English-language journals
Bimonthly journals
Law journals edited by students
Fordham University School of Law